Alan Stevenson (born 6 November 1950) is an English former professional association footballer who played as a goalkeeper. He played for four clubs in the Football League, making a total of over 600 league appearances.
After his retirement, he became Commercial Manager at  Hartlepool, later at Middlesbrough, West Bromwich Albion and Huddersfield Town.
At  Huddersfield, he oversaw their stadium move and fulfilled similar roles with Bolton Wanderers, Wembley Stadium, Hull City, Widnes Rugby League, Coventry City, Doncaster Rovers, Shrewsbury Town and Chesterfield.
In September 2013, he joined York City to oversee their 2016 move to a new stadium.

References

1950 births
Living people
People from Staveley, Derbyshire
Footballers from Derbyshire
English footballers
England under-23 international footballers
Association football goalkeepers
Chesterfield F.C. players
Burnley F.C. players
Rotherham United F.C. players
Hartlepool United F.C. players
English Football League players